Micrutalis is a genus of treehoppers in the family Membracidae. There are at least 30 described species in Micrutalis.

Species
These 33 species belong to the genus Micrutalis:

 Micrutalis apicalis Goding c g
 Micrutalis atrovena Goding c g
 Micrutalis balteata Fairmaire c g
 Micrutalis bella Goding c g
 Micrutalis binaria Fairmaire c g
 Micrutalis callangensis Goding c g
 Micrutalis calva Say c g b (honeylocust treehopper)
 Micrutalis chapadensis Goding c g
 Micrutalis discalis Walker c g
 Micrutalis dorsalis (Fitch, 1851) c g b
 Micrutalis ephippium Burmeister c g
 Micrutalis flava Goding c g
 Micrutalis geniculata Stål c g
 Micrutalis godfreyi Sakakibara 1976 c g
 Micrutalis incerta Sakakibara 1976 c g
 Micrutalis lata Goding c g
 Micrutalis lugubrina Stål c g
 Micrutalis malleifera Fowler c g
 Micrutalis melanogramma Perty c g
 Micrutalis minuta Buckton, 1902 g
 Micrutalis nigrolineata Stål c g
 Micrutalis nigromarginata Funkhouser c g
 Micrutalis notatipennis Fowler c g
 Micrutalis occidentalis Goding c g b
 Micrutalis pallens Fowler c g
 Micrutalis parva (Goding, 1893) c g b
 Micrutalis plagiata Stål c g
 Micrutalis punctifera Walker c g
 Micrutalis stipulipennis Buckton c g
 Micrutalis tartaredoides Goding c g
 Micrutalis tau Goding c g
 Micrutalis tripunctata Fairmaire c g
 Micrutalis zeteki Goding c g

Data sources: i = ITIS, c = Catalogue of Life, g = GBIF, b = Bugguide.net

References

Further reading

External links

 

Smiliinae
Auchenorrhyncha genera